Sandinenses may refer to:

S.C. Dragões Sandinenses, Portuguese football club
G.D.R.C. Os Sandinenses, Portuguese football club